John Robert Goddard (born 2 June 1993) is an English professional footballer who plays as a winger for National League South club Slough Town.

Goddard began his career at Reading, progressing through the youth system before signing his first professional contract in 2011. He was released a year later and spent one season at Conference South club Hayes & Yeading United. Goddard then signed for Conference Premier club Woking in September 2013 after a successful trial period. He spent three years at Woking before returning to the Football League when he signed for Swindon Town for an undisclosed fee in May 2016. He subsequently signed for Stevenage in January 2018. He was loaned out to Bromley of the National League at the start of the 2018–19 season and then joined Aldershot Town on a six-month deal in January 2019. Goddard signed for divisional rivals Ebbsfleet United in July 2019. He rejoined Woking in August 2020, where he spent the 2020–21 season before joining National League South club St Albans City a year later. Goddard joined Slough Town in July 2022.

Early life
Born in Sandhurst, Berkshire, Goddard attended Sandhurst School.

Club career

Early career
Goddard joined Reading at the age of eight in 2001. He progressed through the youth academy at the Berkshire club before signing his first professional contract in the summer of 2011, a one-year deal. He spent the majority of the 2011–12 season playing for Reading's development team, although ultimately did not make any first-team appearances for the club. Reading won promotion back to the Premier League that season, and Goddard was told that he would be released upon the expiry of his contract on 30 June 2012.

Ahead of the 2012–13 campaign, Goddard joined Conference South club Hayes & Yeading United on a one-year contract. He made his debut for the club in a 1–1 draw away at Weston-super-Mare, playing for the first 70 minutes of the match before being replaced by Tobi Joseph. Goddard scored once during the season; his solitary goal came from close-range in a 4–1 away victory over Eastleigh in the FA Trophy on 10 November 2012. He made 37 appearances in all competitions as Hayes & Yeading finished the season in 17th-place.

Woking
Goddard spent time on trial at Conference Premier club Woking in July 2013, hoping to secure a contract with the club for the 2013–14 season. He was described as "the pick of an unfamiliar bunch" when he came on as a substitute and scored twice in a 3–2 pre-season friendly defeat to Staines Town. Goddard signed for Woking two weeks into the new season, joining on an initial one-year agreement on 1 September 2013. He made his competitive Woking debut in a 2–0 victory over Hyde United on 17 September 2013, replacing Gavin Williams with eight minutes remaining. Goddard scored his first Woking goal in a 2–0 away victory over Gateshead on 15 February 2014, doubling Woking's advantage when he scored from Kevin Betsy's cross in the 70th minute. He went to score three times in 36 appearances during his first season with the club. Shortly after the end of the season, on 5 May 2014, Goddard signed a one-year contract extension to remain at Woking for the 2014–15 season. He scored seven times during his second season with the club, including the first brace of his career in a 3–1 win at Dartford in March 2015, as he made 46 appearances in a campaign that saw Woking miss out on the Conference Premier play-off places after finishing in seventh-place.

The 2015–16 campaign, Goddard's third year at Woking, would ultimately prove to be his breakthrough season. Two goals in the club's second game of the season, a 2–0 victory over Bromley at Kingfield Stadium on 11 August 2015, would serve as the catalyst for Goddard's most prolific goalscoring form of his career as he went on to score seven goals in nine games from midfield. Included in this run of goals was another brace in a 4–4 draw away at Guiseley on 12 September 2015, as well as the winning goal in a 2–1 win against Forest Green Rovers three days later to end the league leaders' unbeaten start to the campaign. He scored two goals within the space of six days in two narrow victories against local rivals Aldershot Town when the two teams met over the festive period. He scored 17 goals in 46 appearances from midfield during the campaign. He was named as Woking's Player of the Year at the end of the season.

Swindon Town
Two weeks after the conclusion of the season, on 13 May 2016, Goddard signed for League One club Swindon Town for an undisclosed fee and on a three-year deal. Swindon stated they had secured Goddard's signature ahead of a number of Championship and rival League One clubs. He made his Swindon debut on the opening day of the 2016–17 season, in a 1–0 victory against Coventry City, playing the full 90 minutes. Goddard scored his first goal for Swindon in a 1–1 draw away at Shrewsbury Town on 1 October 2016. Goddard's third and final goal of the season came in the reverse fixture against Shrewsbury Town on 7 January 2017, who he had scored against three months earlier, in another 1–1 draw. His goal in the match came from the penalty spot. Goddard made the highest number of appearances for Swindon during his debut season in the Football League, scoring three times in 48 matches, as Swindon were relegated to League Two.

Goddard suffered a foot injury in Swindon's opening day win at Carlisle United on 5 August 2017, with the injury keeping him out of first-team action for the opening six weeks of the 2017–18 campaign. He scored his first goal of the season on 14 October 2017, "putting the finishing touches to a superb team move" to double Swindon's advantage in an eventual 3–1 away victory over Mansfield Town. Despite returning to the first-team squad, 10 of Goddard's 17 appearances during the season had come from the substitutes' bench, and he did not play for the final six weeks of his time at Swindon before his exit. He made 65 appearances during his one-and-a-half-year spell, scoring five goals.

Stevenage
Goddard signed for fellow League Two club Stevenage on 31 January 2018, joining on a -year contract for an undisclosed fee. He made his Stevenage debut on 3 February 2018, playing the opening 74 minutes in a 3–2 away defeat at Accrington Stanley. Following the arrival of new manager, Dino Maamria, Goddard fell out of favour at Stevenage and made three further appearances before being transfer-listed at the end of the campaign.

Goddard joined National League club Bromley on loan at the start of the 2018–19 season, on 17 August 2018, on a deal until January 2019. He made his Bromley debut a day after signing for the club, starting the match and playing 92 minutes in Bromley's first win of the season, a 1–0 home victory over Gateshead. He scored his first goal for Bromley in an away loss at Leyton Orient on 17 November 2018, giving Bromley a first-half lead in an eventual 3–1 defeat. Goddard made 16 appearances in all competitions during the loan spell, scoring once.

Aldershot Town
After his loan at Bromley concluded, Goddard signed for fellow National League club Aldershot Town on a six-month deal on 18 January 2019. He made his debut a day after joining the club, playing the whole match in a 2–0 home defeat to Chesterfield. Goddard scored once for Aldershot during the second half of the season, his goal coming in a 2–0 away victory against Boreham Wood on 23 March 2019. He made 18 appearances as Aldershot finished in 21st place in the National League.

Ebbsfleet United
Goddard went on trial with National League club Ebbsfleet United in pre-season ahead of the 2019–20 season. He signed for the club on a permanent basis on 16 July 2019. The move meant he was reunited with manager Garry Hill, who had previously managed Goddard for three seasons at Woking. Goddard scored on his debut in a 4–1 home defeat to FC Halifax Town on 3 August 2019. He made 23 appearances in all competitions, scoring once, before the National League season was curtailed due to the COVID-19 pandemic in March 2020. Goddard left Ebbsfleet following the expiry of his contract in July 2020.

Return to Woking
Goddard re-signed for Woking on 13 August 2020, joining a one-year contract. He made his first appearance back at Woking when he came on as a 67th-minute substitute in the club's 2–1 victory against Solihull Moors on 3 October 2020. Goddard made nine appearances during the 2020–21 season, leaving the club at the end of the season when his contract expired.

St Albans City
Goddard joined National League South club St Albans City on 8 August 2021, following a short-term trial period. On the opening day of the 2021–22 campaign, Goddard made his debut for the Saints, replacing Romeo Akinola in the 66th minute during their 3–1 home defeat to Dartford. On 30 October 2021, Goddard scored his first goal for the club, igniting a 2–1 comeback over Eastbourne Borough, after Charley Kendall had given the visitors an early lead.

Slough Town
On 21 June 2022, it was announced that Goddard would join fellow National League South side, Slough Town following the expiry of his contract with St Albans.

International career
Goddard received his first call-up for the England C squad by manager Paul Fairclough on 4 March 2016, ahead of a fixture against Ukraine under-20s on 22 March 2016. He made his England C debut in a 2–0 victory, in which he played the full 90 minutes, playing a part in both goals. Goddard received his final England C team call-up for their game against Slovakia under-21s on 18 May 2016, playing the whole match in a 4–3 defeat.

Coaching career
Goddard earned his UEFA B Licence in 2014 and is an FA qualified coach. He founded Core Football Coaching in 2013, which is a football youth academy based in Berkshire.

Career statistics

Honours
Individual
 Woking Player of the Year: 2015–16

References

External links

1993 births
Living people
People from Sandhurst, Berkshire
English footballers
Association football wingers
Reading F.C. players
National League (English football) players
Hayes & Yeading United F.C. players
Woking F.C. players
Swindon Town F.C. players
Stevenage F.C. players
Bromley F.C. players
Aldershot Town F.C. players
Ebbsfleet United F.C. players
St Albans City F.C. players
Slough Town F.C. players
English Football League players
England semi-pro international footballers